Hermann Lorenz Künneth (July 6, 1892 Neustadt an der Haardt – May 7, 1975 Erlangen) was a German mathematician and renowned algebraic topologist, best known for his contribution to what is now known as the Künneth theorem.

In the winter semester 1910/11, Künneth joined the students' fraternity “Studentengesangverein Erlangen“, now “Akademisch-Musikalische Verbindung Fridericiana Erlangen“ (“Students' Choral Society Erlangen“, now “Akademic Musical Fraternity Fridericiana Erlangen“). He carried out a variety of posts during his studies as well as after having left university in 1914.

He participated in the First World War and was captured by British forces.

His 1922 doctoral thesis at the University of Erlangen was titled Über die Bettischen Zahlen einer Produktmannigfaltigkeit (“On the Betti numbers of a product manifold”), it was supervised by Heinrich Franz Friedrich Tietze.

From 1923, he was a teacher at secondary schools in Kronach and Erlangen. After retiring, he became professor at the University of Erlangen.

In 1964, he was decorated with the Bundesverdienstkreuz, the highest German decoration.

References

Literature 
 Haupt, Otto:  “Hermann Künneth zum Gedenken”, Jahresbericht der Deutschen Mathematiker-Vereinigung, 78 (1976) pp. 61–66 (online)
 Haas, Karl Eduard: “Die Akademisch-Musikalische Verbindung Fridericiana im Sondershäuser Verband“, Erlangen 1982, p. 295

1892 births
1975 deaths
20th-century German mathematicians
Topologists
German military personnel of World War I
People from Neustadt an der Weinstraße
People from the Palatinate (region)
Recipients of the Cross of the Order of Merit of the Federal Republic of Germany